Dalidavichy is a village in Valozhyn District, in the Minsk Region of Belarus.

References

Villages in Belarus
Populated places in Minsk Region
Valozhyn District